Nototriton abscondens is a species of salamander in the family Plethodontidae.
It is endemic to Costa Rica where it is found in Cordillera de Tilarán and Cordillera Central.

Its natural habitat is tropical moist montane forests.
It is threatened by habitat loss.

References

Nototriton
Amphibians of Costa Rica
Endemic fauna of Costa Rica
Taxonomy articles created by Polbot
Amphibians described in 1948